The Second Baptist Church, also known as Pleasant Hill Baptist Church, is a historic African-American Baptist church located at Neosho, Newton County, Missouri. It was built in 1896, and is a one-story, rectangular brick building with Gothic Revival style design elements.  It sits on a stone foundation, has a gable roof, and features a projecting, centered, two-story brick belfry.

It was listed on the National Register of Historic Places in 1996.

References

African-American history of Missouri
Churches on the National Register of Historic Places in Missouri
Gothic Revival church buildings in Missouri
Churches completed in 1896
Buildings and structures in Newton County, Missouri
National Register of Historic Places in Newton County, Missouri